Michael H. Carty (1860 – April 1, 1900) was an Irish-born lawyer and politician in Newfoundland. He served in the Newfoundland House of Assembly from 1882 to 1893 and from 1893 to 1900.

He was born and raised in County Sligo. Carty came to Newfoundland with his family in 1873. He was called to the bar in 1881 and opened his own law office, later practising in partnership with his brother George T. Carty. He was first elected to the assembly in 1882 to represent St. George's; he was defeated when he ran for reelection in 1893 but then was reelected in a by-election later that year. He was elected for Placentia and St. Mary's in 1897. He was named to the Executive Council as a minister without portfolio that same year. In 1898, he was named Queen's Counsel. Carty died in office in 1900.

The community of Cartyville took its name from him.

References 

Members of the Executive Council of Newfoundland and Labrador
1860 births
1900 deaths